This is a list of electoral results for the Electoral district of Menzies in Western Australian state elections.

Members for Menzies

Election results

Elections in the 1920s

 Preferences were not distributed.

Elections in the 1910s

 Mullany had run for Labor at the 1914 election.

Elections in the 1900s

 This result was declared void and was contested again in the 1908 Menzies state by-election.

References

Western Australian state electoral results by district